Nahim Razzaq (born 7 February 1981) is a Bangladeshi politician and member of the Bangladesh Awami League. He has been elected for the consecutive third time as a member of parliament at the Bangladesh Parliament from Shariatpur-3 constituency. Nahim is currently a member of the Parliamentary Standing Committee on Ministry of Foreign Affairs.  He received the Junior Chamber International- Top 10 Outstanding Youth Person (TOYP) award in 2015 in Bangladesh.

He has served in the Parliamentary Standing Committee on the Ministry of Disaster Management and Relief and Ministry of Youth and Sports. Nahim is also an adviser of E-CAB (E-Commerce Association of Bangladesh). Nahim is also engaged in addressing climate change issues as the Convenor of Climate Parliament Bangladesh.

Early life and education
Nahim was born and grew up in Dhaka. His father, Abdur Razzaq, was a veteran national leader from Bangladesh Awami League and leading organizer of liberation war in 1971. Abdur Razzaq was elected as the party’s General Secretary for two times and the member of the national parliament for six times. Abdur Razzaq was appointed as the Minister of the Ministry of Water Resources from 1996 - 2001 in Sheikh Hasina’s first cabinet. Abdur Razzaq was a national leader being one of the four sector commanders of the Bangladesh Liberation Force or Mujib Bahini during the 1971 liberation war of Bangladesh.

Nahim started education in several educational institutions in Bangladesh, India, United Kingdom. He started his education in Government Laboratory High School and went on to finishing his secondary education at St. Paul's School, Darjeeling. He completed his higher secondary with distinction from the Mayo College. He completed his Under-graduation from Middlesex University on double majors on Business and Marketing with distinction.

Political career
After the attempted assassination on the senior leadership of Bangladesh Awami League on 21st August 2004 by the then regime and Islamic fundamentalist group JMB where Nahim’s father along with the highest leadership of the then opposition party was seriously injured, Nahim came back to Bangladesh and started active activism. Nahim began his political career with Bangladesh Awami League being the organising secretary of Damudya Poura Sabha unit in 2008. He became the member and advisor for the district committee of Shariatpur in 2012 and has been holding this position since then twice. Nahim was elected as a member of Damudya Upazila Awami League unit since 2015.

In 2008 National General Election, he was the chief coordinator for his father where his father won a landslide victory and helped Bangladesh Awami League to form the government. After the demise of his father on 23 December 2011, he received nomination and won uncontested in the bi-election becoming the youngest member of parliament in the Bangladesh National Parliament in March 2012. Since then he has been elected another 2 times in the 2014 and 2018 national general election in the 10th and 11th sessions respectively.

Activities and achievements
Nahim is the founding Convener of National Youth Paltform called YOUNG BANGLA which has steered the party’s policy of youth engagement under the able leadership of the chairperson of CRI (Centre for Research and Information) Sajeeb Wazed along with members of the trustee Saima Wazed, Radwan Mujib Siddiq and Nasrul Hamid. He has played a vital role in forming the National Youth Policy during his tenure as an active member of the Parliamentary Standing Committee on the Ministry of Youth and Sport from 2014 to 2018. Nahim also holds responsibility as the Co-Chair of UNYSAB (United Nations Youth and Students Association of Bangladesh) which promotes volunteerism under UN charter. Nahim is also the initiator of Bangabandhu Inter-University Sports Championship engaging students across all public and private universities with over 100 university’s participation since 2019. He is one of the organisers for one of the largest music festival in Bangladesh since 2015 called Joy Bangla Concert.

He has also been handed the responsibility of leading policy advocacy on Climate Change as the Convenor of Climate Parliament Bangladesh caucus which promoted renewable energy and sustainable development policies. He has been included in the advisory panel for e-Cab (E-Commerce Association of Bangladesh) for his role in forming the association and his active role in promoting e-commerce in Bangladesh.

Nahim leads now as an member of the Parliamentary Standing Committee on Ministry of Foreign Affairs since 2019. He is the Co-Chair of DHAKA GLOBAL DIALOGUE which is created to stimulate and engage global leader in this Asian Century for shaping the next century where Dhaka can play a big role in connecting the South Asia to the South East Asia, create a free and safe Bay of Bengal for an economic prosperity and promote peace and harmony across the region and beyond.

Recognition
1. Nahim Razzaq have received the Junior Chamber International (JCI) – TOYP Top 10 Outstanding Youth Person Award in 2015 in Bangladesh

References

Living people
Awami League politicians
9th Jatiya Sangsad members
10th Jatiya Sangsad members
11th Jatiya Sangsad members
Place of birth missing (living people)
1981 births
Alumni of Middlesex University